The Devils Lake Masonic Temple in Devils Lake, North Dakota is a Masonic building from 1916. It was listed on the National Register of Historic Places (NRHP) in 2001.

Its NRHP nomination asserts that the building "possesses an outstanding collection of stylistic elements which typify the Classical Revival style. It stands as a detached building with each facade reflecting the principles of the Classical Revival and its concerns for proportion and symmetry as interpreted by its designer, local architect, Joseph A. Shannon (1859 -1934)."

References

Clubhouses on the National Register of Historic Places in North Dakota
Neoclassical architecture in North Dakota
Masonic buildings completed in 1916
Masonic buildings in North Dakota
National Register of Historic Places in Ramsey County, North Dakota
1916 establishments in North Dakota